Bharya Veettil Paramasukham is a 1999 Indian Malayalam film,  directed by Rajan Sithara. The film stars Vijayaraghavan and Mayoori in the lead roles.

Cast
Vijayaraghavan as Ramankutti
Rajan P. Dev as Anakkadu Vasu/Anakkadu Pappan
Jagathy Sreekumar as Sadhashivan
Sudheesh as Puthooramvettil Unnikrishnan/Unnikuttan
Harishree Ashokan as Shiyami
Chithra as Puthooramvettil Durgadevi
Mayoori as Puthooramvettil Maya
Devi Chandana as Gayathri
Priyanka as Puthooramvettil Padminidevi
Kundara Johnny as Ramabhadran
 Manuraj
Philomina as Bhargavi

Soundtrack
The music was composed by Jerson Antony and the lyrics were written by Ranjith Mattanchery.

References

External links
 

1999 films
1990s Malayalam-language films